Lok Nayak Hospital, formerly known as Irwin Hospital till November 1977, then changed to Lok Nayak Jai Prakash Hospital (LNJP) in the honour of Jayaprakash Narayan, Indian independence activist and politician. It is maintained and run by the Health and Family Welfare Department, Government of Delhi.

History 

The history of Lok Nayak Hospital traces back to the British India when the Central Jail Complex was made to change to a hospital under the then Viceroy of India Lord Irwin. Its foundation stone was laid on 10 January 1930 and under Lt. Col. Cruickshank in 1936 this Central Jail Complex was commissioned to Irwin Hospital.
At that time it was a 350-bed hospital but after the 1947 independence of India there was a sudden rise in the need of more beds as there was an influx of population in form of refugees from neighboring countries and states.

In November 1977, Irwin Hospital's name was changed to Lok Nayak Jai Prakash Hospital and again in 1989 the name was changed from Lok Nayak Jai Prakash Hospital to Lok Nayak Hospital.

Medical facilities

References 

Hospitals in Delhi
Hospitals established in 1936
1936 establishments in India